CMA CGM Lapérouse is an Explorer class containership built for CMA CGM. It is named after French naval officer and explorer Lapérouse. Delivered in September 2010, it has a capacity of 13,800 TEU.

References

Container ships
Laperouse
Laperouse
Ships built by Daewoo Shipbuilding & Marine Engineering
2009 ships